Anolis quadriocellifer, the Cuban eyespot anole or peninsula anole, is a species of lizard in the family Dactyloidae. The species is found in Cuba.

References

Anoles
Reptiles described in 1919
Endemic fauna of Cuba
Reptiles of Cuba
Taxa named by Thomas Barbour